Barry Steven Miller (born 29 March 1976) is an English former professional footballer and was active between 1996 and 2004 and played in England. He played in the Football League for Gillingham, and also had spells with clubs including Doncaster Rovers, Wokingham, Gillingham, Woking, Hucknall Town, Leigh RMI, Farnborough Town and Burton Albion.

Career
Miller began his career as a junior with Brentford, but didn't make any first team appearances before moving to Wokingham in August 1996 on a free transfer.

He moved to Farnborough in August 1997, and shortly moved to Gillingham, where he didn't make as much of an impact as he would have liked. He then went on two successful loan spells to Woking and Doncaster Rovers. In September 2000, he made his loan move to Doncaster Rovers permanent and enjoyed his most successful spell at a club in his career.

References

External links
 

1976 births
Living people
English footballers
Wokingham & Emmbrook F.C. players
Farnborough F.C. players
Gillingham F.C. players
Woking F.C. players
Doncaster Rovers F.C. players
Hucknall Town F.C. players
Leigh Genesis F.C. players
Burton Albion F.C. players
Footballers from Ealing
Wokingham Town F.C. players
Association football defenders